A Pakistani Canadian document-forger and immigrant-smuggler, Michael John Hamdani (also Amarjit Singh Sangha, Azam Shah, Ranjit Singh, Ahmad Malik) rose to notoriety after he entered a plea bargain with authorities, and triggered a manhunt for five fictitious Middle Eastern terrorists he invented. Authorities were later chastised for crying wolf, and frightening the public with a terrorism alert from the information they had.

2002 terrorism hoax

Arrested in October 2002 with $600,000 worth of forged traveler's cheques, Hamdani later told prosecutors that Middle-Eastern men had approached him about acquiring documentation to allow them to travel from Pakistan, to England, to Canada, and finally entering the United States on December 24. He claimed to have been offered a large sum of money, but denied that he had created the false passports.

By December 29, the FBI had alerted authorities across the country to be on the lookout, transmitting photographs, names and birthdates of five people provided by Hamdani. The names and ages were Abid Noraiz Ali, 25; Iftikhar Khozmai Ali, 21; Mustafa Khan Owasi, 33; Adil Pervez; 19; and Akbar Jamal, 28. The following day, a woman reported having seen two of the men on a ferry in Vancouver, British Columbia three weeks earlier.

The Toronto Sun stated that the men had arrived at Pearson Airport weeks earlier, and claimed refugee status. Some media outlets began claiming the men had crossed the border in Mohawk Territory, leading to a complaint from natives that they were being unfairly blamed when no evidence supported the claim. On December 30, anti-terrorism police stormed six locations in Brooklyn and Queens, New York in connection with the investigation.

Several days after the manhunt began, a jeweler in Lahore, Pakistan named Mohammed Asghar came forward to state that one of the photographs was of him, and that he had no idea why it had been released with the name "Mustafa Khan Owasi", or associated with any investigation. Authorities then declined to release the other 14 names, due to the "dubious quality" of the information.

Later arrests
Hamdani was arrested again in January 2008, along with his wife, son, daughter and son-in-law, for continuing to operate his forgery business while living in Guelph, avoiding police in Edmonton, Toronto and Vancouver.

References

External links
The five photos Hamdani provided

Living people
21st-century Canadian criminals
Canadian male criminals
Pakistani emigrants to Canada
Naturalized citizens of Canada
Forgers
Canadian prisoners and detainees
Prisoners and detainees of Canada
Year of birth missing (living people)